Robert Stewart McLaren (10 May 1919 — 20 August 2006) was a Scottish first-class cricketer and British Army officer.

McLaren was born at Perth in May 1919, where he was educated at Perth Academy. During the Second World War, McLaren was commissioned as a second lieutenant in the Black Watch in February 1943. A club cricketer for Carlton Cricket Club, he made his debut for Scotland in first-class cricket against Warwickshire on Scotland's 1947 tour of England. He played first-class cricket for Scotland until 1949, making six appearances. Playing as a wicket-keeper in the Scotland team, he took 6 catches and made 7 stumpings. A true tailend batsman, he scored 23 runs at an average of 2.87. He joined Dunfermline Cricket Club in November 1953. Outside of cricket, he worked firstly as a bank clerk, before becoming the manager of a steel plant. McLaren died in England at Torquay in August 2006.

References

External links
 

1919 births
2006 deaths
Cricketers from Perth, Scotland
People educated at Perth Academy
Black Watch officers
British Army personnel of World War II
Scottish cricketers